Sukup is a surname. Notable people with the surname include:
Šimon Sukup (born 2001), Czech AI researcher and electrical engineer. 
Milo Sukup (1917–1983), American football player and coach
Ondřej Sukup (born 1988), Czech footballer
Steven Sukup (born 1956), American politician

See also
Suku (disambiguation)